Alcea is a genus of over 80 species of flowering plants in the mallow family Malvaceae, commonly known as the hollyhocks. They are native to Asia and Europe. The single species of hollyhock from the Americas, the streambank wild hollyhock, belongs to a different genus.

Description
Hollyhocks are annual, biennial, or perennial plants usually taking an erect, unbranched form. The herbage usually has a coating of star-shaped hairs. The leaf blades are often lobed or toothed, and are borne on long petioles. The flowers may be solitary or arranged in fascicles or racemes. The notched petals are usually over three centimeters wide and may be pink, white, purple, or yellow. The fruit is a schizocarp, a dry disc divided into over 15 sections that contain seeds.

Species
The following species are accepted:

Alcea abchazica Iljin
Alcea acaulis (Cav.) Alef.
Alcea afghanica I.Riedl
Alcea antoninae Iljin
Alcea apterocarpa (Fenzl) Boiss.
Alcea arbelensis Boiss. & Hausskn.
Alcea assadii Pakravan
Alcea aucheri (Boiss.) Alef.
Alcea baldshuanica (Bornm.) Iljin
Alcea biennis Winterl
Alcea calvertii (Boiss.) Boiss.
Alcea chrysantha (Sam.) Zohary
Alcea damascena (Mouterde) Mouterde
Alcea denudata Boiss.
Alcea digitata (Boiss.) Alef.
Alcea dissecta (Baker f.) Zohary
Alcea djahromi Parsa
Alcea excubita Iljin
Alcea fasciculiflora Zohary
Alcea ficifolia L. – Antwerp hollyhock
Alcea flavovirens (Boiss. & Buhse) Iljin
Alcea freyniana Iljin
Alcea froloviana (Litv.) Iljin
Alcea galilaea Zohary
Alcea ghahremanii Pakravan & Assadi
Alcea gorganica (Rech.f., Aellen & Esfand.) Zohary
Alcea heldreichii (Boiss.) Boiss.
Alcea hohenackeri Boiss.
Alcea hyrcana Grossh.
Alcea ilamica Pakravan
Alcea iranshahrii Pakravan, Ghahr. & Assadi
Alcea karakalensis Freyn
Alcea karsiana (Bordz.) Litv.
Alcea koelzii I.Riedl
Alcea kopetdaghensis Iljin
Alcea kuhsanguia Parsa
Alcea kurdica (Schltdl.) Alef.
Alcea kusjariensis (Iljin ex Grossh.) Iljin
Alcea lasiocalycina Boiss.
Alcea lavateriflora (DC.) Boiss.
Alcea lenkoranica Iljin
Alcea litvinovii (Iljin) Iljin
Alcea loftusii (Baker f.) Zohary
Alcea longipedicellata I.Riedl
Alcea mazandaranica Pakravan & Ghahr.
Alcea mosulensis I.Riedl
Alcea mozaffarianii Ghahr. & Pakravan & Assadi
Alcea nikitinii Iljin
Alcea nudiflora (Lindl.) Boiss.
Alcea peduncularis Boiss. & Hausskn.
Alcea pisidica Hub.-Mor.
Alcea popovii Iljin
Alcea rechingeri (Zohary) I.Riedl
Alcea remotiflora (Boiss. & Heldr.) Alef.
Alcea rhyticarpa (Trautv.) Iljin
Alcea rosea L. – common hollyhock
Alcea rosulata I.Riedl
Alcea rufescens (Boiss.) Boiss.
Alcea rugosa Alef.
Alcea scabridula I.Riedl
Alcea schirazana Alef.
Alcea semnanica Pakravan
Alcea setosa (Boiss.) Alef. – bristly hollyhock
Alcea sophiae Iljin
Alcea sosnovskyi Iljin
Alcea sotudehi Parsa
Alcea striata (DC.) Alef.
Alcea sulphurea (Boiss. & Hohen.) Alef.
Alcea sycophylla Iljin & V.V.Nikitin
Alcea tabrisiana (Boiss. & Buhse) Iljin
Alcea talassica Iljin
Alcea tarica Pakravan & Ghahr.
Alcea teheranica Parsa
Alcea tholozanii Stapf
Alcea transcaucasica (Iljin) Iljin
Alcea turcomanica Iljin
Alcea turkeviczii Iljin
Alcea vameghii Parsa
Alcea wilhelminae I.Riedl
Alcea woronowii (Iljin ex Grossh.) Iljin
Alcea xanthochlora I.Riedl

Uses
Hollyhocks are popular garden ornamental plants. They are easily grown from seed. Breeds with red flowers attract hummingbirds and butterflies. Cultivars have been bred, especially from A. rosea. They include the double-flowered 'Chater's Double', the raspberry-colored 'Creme de Cassis', and 'The Watchman', which has dark, nearly black, maroon flowers.

The stems of hollyhocks can be used as firewood, and the roots have been used medicinally.

Pests and diseases

Alcea species are used as food plants by the larvae of some Lepidoptera species including Bucculatrix quadrigemina and Vanessa cardui, the painted lady.

The mallow flea beetle (Podagrica fuscicornis) is a pest that makes tiny holes in the leaves. Cutworms, aphids, and capsid bugs use the plant as a food source in hotter and drier conditions. A number of weevils use A. rosea as their host plant, including Rhopalapion longirostre, Alocentron curvirostre, and Aspidapion validum.

The plants are also susceptible to the pathogenic fungus Puccinia malvacearum, the hollyhock rust.

Culture
The Aoi Matsuri (Hollyhock Festival) is one of the three main festivals of the city of Kyoto.
During the Victorian era, the hollyhock symbolized both ambition and fecundity in the language of flowers.

The UK National Collection of hollyhocks is held by Jonathan Sheppard in Lincolnshire.

Gallery

References

External links 
 
 

 
Malveae
Malvaceae genera
Perennial plants
Taxa named by Carl Linnaeus